Edward Jerome Henneberry (August 29, 1890 – September 9, 1953) was a Canadian politician. He served in the Legislative Assembly of New Brunswick as member of the Liberal party from 1935 to 1939.

References

1890 births
1953 deaths
20th-century Canadian politicians
New Brunswick Liberal Association MLAs
Politicians from Saint John, New Brunswick